The National Union of Tunisian Women (Arabic: الاتحاد الوطني للمراة التونسية; French: Union Nationale de la Femme Tunisienne, UNFT) is a non-governmental organization in Tunisia founded in 1956. The current UNFT president is Radhia Jerbi. 

The National Union of Tunisian Women was founded in 1956 by President Habib Bourguiba through the merge of the two previous women's organizations, Tunisian Union of Muslim Women (UMFT) and Union of Tunisian Women (UFT).  It was founded after the independence of Tunisia, which was followed by the introduction of women's suffrage and the secular Code of Personal Statue (CSP), and the UNFT worked to inform women of the new Code of Personal Statue, which was a very radical reform in favor or women's rights and the most progressive family law in the Middle East after the Turkish Law of 1926.

See also 
 Tunisian Association of Democratic Women

References 

Women's rights organizations
Organisations based in Tunisia

1956 establishments in Tunisia
Feminist organisations in Tunisia
Organizations established in 1956
Social history of Tunisia
Women's rights in Tunisia